Hank Williams on Stage is the title of a posthumous live (not live-recorded in studio to sound live) album of Hank Williams released by his record label, MGM in 1962 (see 1962 in country music). The performance is officially credited to Hank Williams and his Drifting Cowboys with Hank's first wife Audrey Williams, who sings back-up vocals. It was recorded as part of the "Health and Happiness Broadcasts" at the old Castle Studio at Eighth and Church Streets in Nashville in October 1949. Long-time WSM announcer Grant Turner hosted the event and wrote the album's liner notes. This release has long since been supplanted by the complete "Health and Happiness" recordings. Not noted by the original author is the fact that this contains studio recordings interspersed with the "live" recordings on both this and the follow up album. The two albums do not contain every Health and Happiness Show.

The album art differs between the U.K. and U.S. releases.

Track listing

Side One
"Rovin' Cowboy" - :50
"[Wedding Bells" (Claude Boone) - 3:25
"Lovesick Blues" (Irving Mills, Cliff Friend) - 2:53
"I'll Have a New Body" - 2:07
"Lost Highway" (Leon Payne) - 3:02
"Joe Clark" - :29
"Where the Soul of Man Never Dies" (Wayne Raney) - 1:31

Side Two
"Rovin' Cowboy" - :50
"I'm a Long Gone Daddy" (Hank Williams) - 2:28
"I'm Tellin' You" (Billy Hughes, Texas Jim Lewis) - 1:50
"Bill Cheatam" - 1:00
"When God Comes and Gathers His Jewels (Williams) - 2:54
"The Blues Come Around" (Williams) - 2:46
"I Wanna Live and Love Always" - 2:06

Personnel
Hillous Butrum - bass
Don Helms - steel guitar
Bob McNett - guitar
Jerry Rivers - fiddle
Hank Williams - vocals, guitar

Sources

Liner Notes: (1962) Hank Williams - Hank Williams on Stage(LP). MGM 3999

Live albums published posthumously
Hank Williams albums
1962 live albums
MGM Records live albums